Richard Martin Lusinga (born 26 October 1990), known professionally as Rich Mavoko, is a Tanzanian singer and songwriter. He was initially signed to 'King Kaka Records' in 2016, a record label founded by Kenyan rapper King Kaka, and later to WCB Wasafi. Some of his most widely known songs include 'Kokoro' featuring Diamond Platnumz, 'Rudi' featuring Patoranking, 'Show Me' featuring Harmonize, and 'Bad Boy' featuring A.Y. In 2020 he released his first E.P, 'MiniTape' as an independent artist.

Music career 

Rich Mavoko's departure from WCB Wasafi was mired in controversy, with many speculating as to why he ultimately decided to leave the label. When questioned, Mavoko attributed his swift departure to an alleged top down pyramid structure at the label, with one artist receiving greater investment than others; he also mentioned unfair contractual terms as one of his reasons for seeking to terminate his contract with the label and for seeking legal redress. It was not an In 2019, former WCB label mate, Harmonize, also exited the label citing similar reasons. It has since been reported that the two may soon be label mates again, if Rich Mavoko accepts Harmonize's invitation to sign to his newly formed Konde Music Worldwide.

Personal life

He is known for being extremely private regarding his private life. When it was reported that he was dating fellow Tanzanian artist Lulu Diva in 2020 he was quick dispelled these rumours.

Discography

Singles

EPs

 MiniTape (2020)
Niwahi
Bad Boy (feat. A.Y.)
Lalama
Wa Moto 
Baishoo
Silimisha
Kolo
Wamilele

Awards and nominations

References

1990 births
Living people
21st-century Tanzanian male singers
People from Dar es Salaam
 Tanzanian Bongo Flava musicians
 Swahili-language singers